James II commonly refers to James II of England (1633–1701), also James VII of Scotland

James II may also refer to:

 James II of Avesnes (died c. 1205), knight of the Fourth Crusade
 James II of Majorca (died 1311), Lord of Montpellier
 James II of Aragon (1267–1327), King of Sicily
 James II, Count of La Marche (1370–1438), King Consort of Naples
 James II, Count of Urgell (1380–1433)
 James II of Scotland (1430–1460), King of Scots (1437–1460)
 James II of Cyprus (circa 1438–1473), Titular King of Jerusalem

Other uses
 James II (record), a 1985 EP by James
 "James II" (Adventure Time), a television episode

See also
 James I (disambiguation)
 James III (disambiguation)
 James IV (1473–1513), King of Scotland 
 James V (1512–1542), King of Scotland